Stoborough Green is a village in the English county of Dorset. It is situated to the south of the village of Stoborough and about 2 kilometres south of the town of Wareham.

Stoborough Green forms part of the civil parish of Arne, within the Dorset unitary authority.

External links

Isle of Purbeck
Villages in Dorset